Raymond Robert Bray (February 1, 1917 – December 26, 1993) was an American professional football player who was an offensive guard and defensive lineman for 11 seasons in the National Football League (NFL). He served in the U.S. Navy from 1943–1945.

His football career began at Western State Normal School (now known as Western Michigan University) where he played football from 1936–1938.

He was born in Caspian, Michigan.

References

1917 births
1993 deaths
Players of American football from Michigan
American football defensive linemen
Western Michigan Broncos football players
Chicago Bears players
Green Bay Packers players
Western Conference Pro Bowl players
People from Iron County, Michigan
United States Navy personnel of World War II